Christine Margaret Sinclair  (born June 12, 1983) is a Canadian professional soccer player who plays as a forward and captains both National Women's Soccer League (NWSL) club Portland Thorns FC and the Canadian national team. An Olympic gold medalist, two-time Olympic bronze medalist,  CONCACAF champion, and 14-time winner of the Canada Soccer Player of the Year award, Sinclair is the world's all-time leader for international goals scored for men or women with 190 goals, and is one of the most-capped active international footballers with more than 300 caps. She is also the second footballer of either sex to score at five World Cup editions, preceded by Marta, later equalled by Cristiano Ronaldo.

Having played over 20 seasons with the senior national team, Sinclair has played in five FIFA Women's World Cups (USA 2003, China 2007, Germany 2011, Canada 2015, France 2019) and four Olympic Football Tournaments (Beijing 2008, London 2012, Rio 2016, Tokyo 2020). She has been shortlisted for FIFA Women's World Player of the Year seven times, in 2005, 2006, 2007, 2008, 2010, 2012, and 2016.

Sinclair has won championships with three professional teams: the 2010 WPS Championship with FC Gold Pride, the 2011 WPS Championship with Western New York Flash, and the 2013 and 2017 NWSL Championships with Portland Thorns FC. She won the national collegiate Division I championship twice, in 2002 and 2005, with the University of Portland. In 2012, she won the Lou Marsh Trophy as Canada's athlete of the year, and the Bobbie Rosenfeld Award as Canada's female athlete of the year.

In September 2013, Sinclair was inducted into Canada's Walk of Fame and in June 2017, she was appointed an Officer of the Order of Canada by Governor General David Johnston. In January 2022, Sinclair was awarded with the Best FIFA Special Award, as the world's all-time leading scorer.

Early life 
Born in Burnaby, British Columbia, to Bill and Sandra Sinclair on June 12, 1983, Sinclair began playing soccer at the age of four for an under-7 team. Her father Bill Sinclair (1972) and uncles Brian (1972) and Bruce Gant (1990) were all Canadian amateur soccer champions while Brian and Bruce also played at the professional level. Her father Bill played for the University of British Columbia and the New Westminster Blues in the Pacific Coast Soccer League.

Christine Sinclair also played basketball and baseball as a youth. Playing in a Burnaby boys' baseball league, she made the local under-11 all-star team as a second baseman. With the team, she chose the number 12 as a tribute to Toronto Blue Jays' second baseman Hall of Famer, Roberto Alomar.

Sinclair was selected to British Columbia's under-14 girls all-star soccer team at age 11 and led club team Burnaby Girls Soccer Club to six league titles, five provincial titles, and two top-five national finishes. She attended Burnaby South Secondary School where she led the soccer team to three league championships. At age 15, she attended matches of the 1999 FIFA Women's World Cup in Portland, Oregon. She played for Canada's under-18 national team before making her debut at the senior level at age 16 at the 2000 Algarve Cup where she scored three goals.

College career 
In 2001, Sinclair arrived at the University of Portland where she made an immediate impact on an already formidable soccer program. She recorded 23 goals and eight assists in her first season, leading all first-year students in NCAA Division I total scoring. She was named Freshman of the Year by Soccer America, and was a consensus All-America selection.

During her second season with the Pilots in 2002, Sinclair led Division I in goals with 26. She scored two goals during the national championship game against conference rival Santa Clara, the second of which was a golden goal that won the Pilots the national championship. Sinclair earned three different national Player of the Year honours, and was a finalist for the Hermann Trophy. Named West Coast Conference Player of the Year, she earned All-American honours for the second consecutive year. In the wake of her success for the Canadian national teams and American collegiate soccer, she was named by The Globe and Mail as one of the 25 most influential people in Canadian sports the same year.

Sinclair chose to redshirt the 2003 season to play for Canada at the 2003 FIFA Women's World Cup. She returned to Portland in 2004 and scored 22 goals for the Pilots. Following the season, she was named West Coast Conference (WCC) Player of the Year, received All-American honours, and was awarded the Hermann Trophy.

During Sinclair's senior year at Portland, she set an all-time Division I goal-scoring record with 39. She capped off her collegiate career with two goals in a 4–0 rout of UCLA in the national title game. This performance also gave her a career total of 25 goals in NCAA tournament play, also a record. She was named WCC Player of the Year becoming the second player in conference history to be honoured three times. Sinclair was also named Academic All-American of the Year by ESPN The Magazine after graduating with a 3.75 grade point average in life sciences. She was awarded the M.A.C. Hermann Trophy, becoming the fourth player and third woman to win it in back-to-back years. As a result of her record-setting season, Sinclair went on to win the Honda Sports Award as the nation's top soccer player, as well as the Honda-Broderick Cup, as the college woman athlete of the year. She became the third soccer player to win the award, joining Mia Hamm and Cindy Daws. Sinclair finished her collegiate career with 110 goals and 32 assists in 94 games.

Club career

Early career 
From 2006 to 2008, Sinclair played for the Vancouver Whitecaps FC of the USL W-League.

FC Gold Pride 

Sinclair was selected by FC Gold Pride eighth overall in the 2008 WPS International Draft for the inaugural season of top-tier American league Women's Professional Soccer (WPS). Despite her team-leading six goals, FC Gold Pride finished last in the regular season standings during the 2009 season.

Leading into the 2010 season, FC Gold Pride made several changes to their roster including adding Brazilian international Marta, French international Camille Abily, and United States national team defender and midfielder Shannon Boxx. During the team's home opener of the 2010 season against 2009 WPS champion, Sky Blue FC, Sinclair scored twice leading the team to a 3–1 win. She was named WPS Player of the Week for week 14 of the season after scoring two goals against second-place team, Philadelphia Independence. The team dominated the season, finishing first during the regular season after defeating the Philadelphia Independence 4–1 with goals from Sinclair, Marta, and Kelley O'Hara.

As the regular season champion, FC Gold Pride earned a direct route to the championship playoff game where they faced the Philadelphia Independence. Sinclair contributed two goals to FC Gold Pride's 4–0 win to clinch the WPS Championship. Despite their successful season, the club ceased operations on November 16, 2010, due to not meeting the league's financial reserve requirement.

Western New York Flash 

On December 10, 2010, Western New York Flash announced that they had agreed to terms with the Canadian striker for the 2011 season. Sinclair helped guide the team to the regular season championship, leading the club with ten goals and eight assists. On August 27, 2011, Sinclair was named MVP of the 2011 WPS Championship Final after the Flash won the championship in Rochester, New York. Sinclair's goal in the 64th minute gave the Flash a 1–0 lead over Philadelphia. When the game was forced to penalty kicks, Sinclair stepped up and completed the second one as the Flash players converted all five of their attempts.

Portland Thorns FC 

On January 11, 2013, it was announced that Sinclair would play for the Portland Thorns FC for the inaugural season of the National Women's Soccer League via the NWSL Player Allocation. Playing as team captain, she appeared in 20 games in the 2013 season and tied with Alex Morgan as the top scorer on the team with eight goals. Sinclair was named the league's Player of the Month for the month of April after scoring two goals and serving one assist to help the team secure a 2–0–1 record.

After finishing third during the regular season, the Thorns advanced to the playoffs where they defeated second-place team FC Kansas City 3–2 during overtime. During the championship final against regular season champions Western New York Flash, Sinclair scored the final goal to defeat the Flash 2–0.

In the 2017 season, she led the Thorns in scoring with eight goals during the regular season, with the team finishing second. In the playoffs, she scored a goal, tying the record for NWSL playoff goals, en route to the team's second championship in the NWSL Final. In the pandemic-shortened 2020 season, Sinclair led the Thorns with six goals, five more than any of her teammates, helping the Thorns win the NWSL Fall Series.

In 2022, Sinclair captained the team to a second-place finish in the regular season and a third championship title. She set the league record for most playoff minutes played.

International career 
Sinclair played for Canada's under-18 national team before making her debut for the senior team at age 16 at the 2000 Algarve Cup where she was the tournament's leading scorer with three goals. She scored seven goals for Canada at the 2002 CONCACAF Women's Gold Cup, tying her for the tournament lead with teammate Charmaine Hooper and USA's Tiffeny Milbrett, a fellow Portland alumna. The same year, she represented Canada at the inaugural FIFA U-19 Women's World Championship. Her record-setting ten goals in the tournament helped lead Canada to a second-place finish and earned her both the Golden Boot as leading scorer and Golden Ball as tournament MVP. , she is the world's all-time leading international goal-scorer after scoring twice against Saint Kitts and Nevis in a CONCACAF Women's Olympic Qualifying match.

2003 FIFA Women's World Cup 
At the 2003 FIFA Women's World Cup, Sinclair scored three goals for Canada on their way to a surprising fourth-place finish, their best in that competition to date. During the team's first group stage match against Germany, she scored the first goal of the match in the fourth minute. Germany scored four goals to defeat Canada 4–1. After defeating Argentina 3–0, the team faced Japan in their last group stage match of the tournament. With goals from Sinclair and teammates Christine Latham and Kara Lang, Canada won 3–1 and placed second in their group to advance to the knockout stage. Canada faced China in the quarterfinal match on October 2 in Portland, Oregon and won 1–0 with the lone goal scored by Charmaine Hooper in the seventh minute. Having remained winless in all previous World Cup tournaments, Canada's advancement to the semi-final was a historic change for the team. Canada was defeated by Sweden in the semi-final match 2–1 and faced the United States in the third-place match where they were defeated 3–1 and finished fourth at the tournament. Sinclair scored Canada's goal in the 38th minute.

2007 FIFA Women's World Cup, 100th Cap, and 2010 Concacaf Women's Championship 
During Canada's first group stage match at the 2007 FIFA Women's World Cup in China, the team faced Norway and were defeated 2–1. Sinclair scored a brace in the team's next group stage match against Ghana helping Canada win 4–0. She scored a goal in the team's final group stage match against Australia that resulted in a 2–2 draw. Canada finished third in their group and did not advance to the knockout stage of the tournament.

Sinclair made her 100th appearance on August 30, 2007, in a 0–0 friendly against Japan. On November 8, 2010, Sinclair scored the game-winning goal against Mexico in the final of the CONCACAF Women's Championship.

2011 FIFA Women's World Cup 
During Canada's campaign at the 2011 FIFA Women's World Cup, Sinclair scored the team's only goal at the tournament in the 82nd minute in their first group stage match against Germany. Canada was defeated in all three of their group stage matches against Germany, France, and Nigeria and did not advance to the knockout stage.

2012 London Olympics 
At the 2012 Summer Olympics, Sinclair broke the record of most goals scored in the Olympics for women's soccer, claiming the golden boot of the competition from two goals against South Africa, one against Great Britain, and three against the United States. She scored a hat-trick in a 4–3 extra time loss in the semi-final match against the American squad. Canada was unhappy with the performance of referee Christina Pedersen, who made a series of controversial decisions in favour of the Americans. Sinclair was ultimately fined a reported $3,500 and banned four matches for post match comments, which accused Pedersen of bias and deciding the result of the match before it had kicked off.

Sinclair subsequently finished the tournament as top scorer with six goals and led the Canadian women's national soccer team to a bronze medal with a 1–0 win against France on August 9, 2012. Her remarkable effort as team captain and her performance in the semi-final earned her the honour of Canada's flag bearer in the closing ceremony, as well as the Queen Elizabeth II Diamond Jubilee Medal.

Sinclair made her 200th appearance on December 12, 2013, scoring her 147th international goal in a 2–0 win over Scotland at the 2013 Torneio Internacional Cidade de São Paulo.

2015 FIFA Women's World Cup 
At the 2015 FIFA Women's World Cup hosted by Canada, Sinclair scored the team's only goal of the first group stage match against China, a 1–0 win, during a penalty kick awarded in the second minute of second-half stoppage time. Sinclair scored in the 42nd minute in a losing effort against England in the quarter-final. Canada lost the match 2–1.

2019 FIFA Women's World Cup 
At the 2019 FIFA Women's World Cup hosted by France, Sinclair scored one goal against the Netherlands, her tenth goal in five different World Cup editions—an achievement only accomplished by Brazilian Marta, seven days earlier. However, Canada went out in the round of 16, after losing 0–1 against Sweden.

2020 CONCACAF Olympic Qualifying 
On January 29 at the 2020 CONCACAF Women's Olympic Qualifying Championship, Sinclair scored international goals 184 and 185 against St. Kitts and Nevis to tie and then surpass Abby Wambach for first place in international goals by either men or women.

2020 Summer Olympics and 300th Cap 
On July 21, 2021, Sinclair played her 300th match for Canada, in which she scored a goal in a 1–1 draw against hosts Japan in the team's opening match of the 2020 Summer Olympics in Tokyo. Canada accumulated one win and two tied games during group play, before advancing to face Brazil in the quarter final. Scoreless during regular play, Canada prevailed in the shootout 4–3, with Sinclair being denied on the opening attempt.

Canada faced the United States in the semi-final on August 2, a rematch of the 2012 Olympic semi-final. Canada defeated the United States 1–0 due to a goal from a penalty kick by Jessie Fleming, advancing to the Olympic final for the first time in the team's history. Sinclair opined afterward that "it was nice to get a little revenge."

In the final against Sweden on August 6, Sinclair won a penalty which was once again converted by Fleming to tie the game in the second half of regulation time; following a 1–1 draw after extra-time, Canada eventually won the match 3–2 on penalty kicks to capture the gold medal in women's soccer for the first time.

Personal life 
In 2012, Sinclair received the Diamond Jubilee Medal and was named Athlete of the Year by Sportsnet. In 2013, she was inducted into Canada's Walk of Fame and received an honorary degree from Simon Fraser University.

In 2015, Sinclair, along with teammate Kadeisha Buchanan, was featured on a Canadian postage stamp commemorating the 2015 Women's World Cup hosted by Canada. On June 30, 2017, she was appointed an Officer of the Order of Canada, the second-highest award a civilian can receive, with investiture of the award on January 24, 2018. Of the honour she said, "I am a very, very proud Canadian, I am proud of where I am from, and to be recognized in this nature is surreal. It's not something you can dream about happening to you. I can dream of winning a World Cup or an Olympic gold medal, and that's my job, but to have your country recognize you – I don't even know what to say."

In December 2020, she was honoured at The Best FIFA Football Awards after becoming the top international scorer in history. The same month, her 185th international goal was named Canada Soccer's Moment of the Year  and she received the Bobbie Rosenfeld Award for the second time, making her the first team-sport athlete to win the award twice.

In June 2021, the city of Burnaby announced that they would be renaming the Fortius Sport and Health Facilities in her honour, the Facilities becoming the Christine Sinclair Community Centre.

Player profile

Style of play 
Widely regarded as Canada's greatest soccer player of all time and one of the foremost women soccer players in history, Sinclair is a fast, well-rounded, physically strong, and intelligent forward, known for her ball skills, athleticism, technique, and field vision. An accurate finisher and a highly prolific goalscorer, she is a versatile and hard-working player who is capable of playing both as a striker and also as an advanced playmaker in midfield, due to her passing accuracy, ability to read the game, link-up with other midfielders, and creation of chances for teammates. Sinclair is also capable of scoring from free-kicks and penalties. Moreover, she has been labelled as a "big game" player in the media, due to her penchant for scoring goals in important games for her country, as illustrated by her hat-trick against the United States in the semi-finals of the 2012 Olympic Games. In addition to her soccer abilities, she has stood out for her leadership and defensive work-rate throughout her career.

In popular culture

Television and film 
Sinclair was the focus of a digital short documentary entitled The Captain in 2012. She was featured in an episode of The Difference Makers with Rick Hansen the same year. In May 2015, she was featured in the TSN documentary, RISE, along with the rest of the Canadian national team. She starred in a national television commercial for Coca-Cola during the summer of 2015.

Magazines 
Sinclair was featured on the cover of the June 2013 issue of The Walrus. She was featured Sportsnet Magazine in the edition dated June 8, 2015. She was featured on the covers of Ottawa Life Magazine (May/June 2015), FACES Magazine (December 2015), and Canadian Business (August 2016).

Other work 
Sinclair was featured on the Canadian version of EA Sports' FIFA 16 (2016) video game. Along with Portland Thorns FC teammates Alex Morgan and Steph Catley, Sinclair was one of the first women to appear on the cover of any EA Sports game. In July 2017, Sinclair partnered with A&W and the Multiple Sclerosis Society of Canada on a nationwide awareness campaign for multiple sclerosis.

Career statistics

Club

International

Honours 
University of Portland Pilots
 NCAA Division I Women's Soccer Championship: 2002, 2005

FC Gold Pride
 WPS Championship: 2010

Western New York Flash
 WPS Championship: 2011

Portland Thorns FC
 NWSL Championship: 2013, 2017, 2022
 NWSL Shield: 2016, 2021
 NWSL Challenge Cup: 2021
 NWSL Community Shield: 2020
 International Champions Cup: 2021
Canada
 Summer Olympics: 2021
 CONCACAF Women's Championship: 2010
 Pan American Games: 2011
 Algarve Cup: 2016
 Cyprus Women's Cup: 2008, 2011
 Four Nations Tournament: 2015
Individual
 FIFA World Player of the Year: 2002 (6th), 2005 (candidate), 2006 (candidate), 2007 (candidate), 2008 (8th), 2010 (7th), 2012 (5th), 2016 (8th) 
 The Best FIFA Special Award for Outstanding Career Achievement: 2021
 IFFHS CONCACAF Women's Team of the Decade: 2011–2020
 Summer Olympic Golden Boot: 2012
 CONCACAF Women's Gold Cup Golden Boot: 2002, 2006
 FIFA U-19 Women's World Championship Golden Ball: 2002
 FIFA U-19 Women's World Championship Golden Boot: 2002
 WPS Championship Final MVP: 2011
 WPS Best XI: 2011
 NSWL Second XI: 2013, 2018
 Canadian Player of the Decade: 2010-2019
 Canadian Player of the Year: 2000, 2004, 2005, 2006, 2007, 2008, 2009, 2010, 2011, 2012, 2013, 2014, 2016, 2018
 Lou Marsh Award: 2012
 Bobbie Rosenfeld Award: 2012, 2020
 MAC Hermann Trophy: 2004, 2005
 Thorns Supporters Player of the Year: 2018
Orders
 Order of British Columbia
 Officer of the Order of Canada
 Queen Elizabeth II Diamond Jubilee Medal

See also 

 List of women's footballers with 100 or more international goals
 List of women's footballers with 100 or more caps
 List of Olympic medalists in football
 List of inductees of Canada's Walk of Fame
 List of FC Gold Pride players
 List of Vancouver Whitecaps Women players
 List of Academic All-America Team Members of the Year
 List of recipients of Today's Top 10 Award
 List of Canadian sports personalities

References

Further reading 
 Donaldson, Chelsea (2014), Christine Sinclair, Capstone Canada, 
 Fan Hong, J. A. Mangan (2004), Soccer, Women, Sexual Liberation: Kicking Off a New Era, Taylor & Francis, 
 Grainey, Timothy (2012), Beyond Bend It Like Beckham: The Global Phenomenon of Women's Soccer, University of Nebraska Press, 
 Kassouf, Jeff (2011), Girls Play to Win Soccer, Norwood House Press, 
 Mooney, Maggie (2010), Canada's Top 100: The Greatest Athletes of All Time, Greystone Books, 
 Stevens, Dakota (2011), A Look at the Women's Professional Soccer Including the Soccer Associations, Teams, Players, Awards, and More, BiblioBazaar, 
 Stewart, Barbara (2012), Women's Soccer: The Passionate Game, D&M Publishers Incorporated,

External links 

 

 Portland Thorns FC player profile
 Star bio: Canada's Christine Sinclair
 The game not played by Richard Poplak at The Walrus
 

1983 births
Living people
2003 FIFA Women's World Cup players
2007 FIFA Women's World Cup players
2011 FIFA Women's World Cup players
2015 FIFA Women's World Cup players
Women's association football forwards
Canadian expatriate sportspeople in the United States
Canadian expatriate women's soccer players
Canadian women's soccer players
Canada women's international soccer players
FIFA Century Club
FC Gold Pride players
Footballers at the 2007 Pan American Games
Footballers at the 2008 Summer Olympics
Footballers at the 2011 Pan American Games
Footballers at the 2012 Summer Olympics
Lou Marsh Trophy winners
Medalists at the 2012 Summer Olympics
Medalists at the 2016 Summer Olympics
National Women's Soccer League players
Olympic bronze medalists for Canada
Olympic medalists in football
Olympic soccer players of Canada
Pan American Games gold medalists for Canada
Pan American Games bronze medalists for Canada
Portland Pilots women's soccer players
Portland Thorns FC players
Soccer people from British Columbia
Sportspeople from Burnaby
Vancouver Whitecaps FC (women) players
Western New York Flash players
Footballers at the 2016 Summer Olympics
Pan American Games medalists in football
Officers of the Order of Canada
Hermann Trophy women's winners
2019 FIFA Women's World Cup players
Medalists at the 2011 Pan American Games
Medalists at the 2007 Pan American Games
Footballers at the 2020 Summer Olympics
Medalists at the 2020 Summer Olympics
Olympic gold medalists for Canada
Women's Professional Soccer players